The 2012 Asian Shotgun Championships were held at New Moti Bagh Gun Club, Patiala, India between 28 November and 9 December 2012.

Medal summary

Men

Women

Medal table

References 
General
 ISSF Results Overview
 Complete Results

Specific

External links 
 Asian Shooting Federation

Asian Shooting Championships
Asian
Shooting
2012 in Indian sport
Patiala
Shooting competitions in India